Scombramphodon is an extinct genus of prehistoric bony fish that lived from the early to middle Eocene.

References

Prehistoric perciform genera
Eocene fish
Prehistoric fish of Africa